Jarek Goebel is a New Zealand Rugby league footballer who plays for the Shellharbour Sharks in the Bundaberg Red Cup. He was previously a rugby union player who played provincial rugby for Auckland in the Air New Zealand Cup.

Early career

Auckland
Goebel played in Auckland for club side University, and he was named in the 2008 Auckland side for the Air New Zealand Cup.

References

External links
Auckland Player Profile
Illawarramercury News Article

New Zealand rugby union players
1985 births
Living people
People educated at Macleans College
Rugby union fullbacks
Rugby union wings